Independiente Foot-Ball Club also referred to as Independiente de Campo Grande is a Paraguayan football club based in the neighborhood of Campo Grande in Asunción. Founded on September 20, 1925, they play in the Second Division of Paraguayan League. Their home stadium is Estadio Ricardo Gregor.

Current squad
As of March 2021.

Notable players
To appear in this section a player must have either:
 Been part of a national team at any time.
 Played in the first division of any other football association (outside of Paraguay).
 Played in a continental and/or intercontinental competition.

2010's
 Juan Cardozo (2011)
 Lorenzo Melgarejo (2011)
 Diego Gavilán (2012)
Non-CONMEBOL players
  Yohei Iwasaki (2012–2013)

Honors
Second Division (1): 2016
Third Division (4): 1962, 1975, 1980, 2001

Managers
 Alicio Solalinde (Feb 29, 2012–May 31, 2012)

References

External links
Independiente FBC Info

Football clubs in Paraguay
Football clubs in Asunción
Association football clubs established in 1925
1925 establishments in Paraguay